In physics, cryogenics is the production and behaviour of materials at very low temperatures.

The 13th IIR International Congress of Refrigeration (held in Washington DC in 1971) endorsed a universal definition of "cryogenics" and "cryogenic" by accepting a threshold of 120 K (or –153 °C) to distinguish these terms from the conventional refrigeration. This is a logical dividing line, since the normal boiling points of the so-called permanent gases (such as helium, hydrogen, neon, nitrogen, oxygen, and normal air) lie below 120K while the Freon refrigerants, hydrocarbons, and other common refrigerants have boiling points above 120K. The U.S. National Institute of Standards and Technology considers the field of cryogenics as that involving temperatures below -153 Celsius (120K; -243.4 Fahrenheit) 

Discovery of superconducting materials with critical temperatures significantly above the boiling point of nitrogen has provided new interest in reliable, low cost methods of producing high temperature cryogenic refrigeration.

Cryogenicists use the Kelvin or Rankine temperature scale, both of which measure from absolute zero, rather than more usual scales such as Celsius which measures from the freezing point of water at sea level or Fahrenheit which measures from the freezing point of a particular brine solution at sea level.

Definitions and distinctions 

 Cryogenics The branches of engineering that involve the study of very low temperatures (ultra low temperature i.e. below 123 Kelvin), how to produce them, and how materials behave at those temperatures.

 Cryobiology The branch of biology involving the study of the effects of low temperatures on organisms (most often for the purpose of achieving cryopreservation).

 Cryoconservation of animal genetic resources The conservation of genetic material with the intention of conserving a breed.

 Cryosurgery The branch of surgery applying cryogenic temperatures to destroy and kill tissue, e.g. cancer cells.

 Cryoelectronics The study of electronic phenomena at cryogenic temperatures. Examples include superconductivity and variable-range hopping.

 Cryonics Cryopreserving humans and animals with the intention of future revival. "Cryogenics" is sometimes erroneously used to mean "Cryonics" in popular culture and the press.

Etymology 

The word cryogenics stems from Greek κρύος (cryos) – "cold" + γενής (genis) – "generating".

Cryogenic fluids
Cryogenic fluids with their boiling point in kelvins and degree Celsius.

Industrial applications 

Liquefied gases, such as liquid nitrogen and liquid helium, are used in many cryogenic applications. Liquid nitrogen is the most commonly used element in cryogenics and is legally purchasable around the world. Liquid helium is also commonly used and allows for the lowest attainable temperatures to be reached.

These liquids may be stored in Dewar flasks, which are double-walled containers with a high vacuum between the walls to reduce heat transfer into the liquid.  Typical laboratory Dewar flasks are spherical, made of glass and protected in a metal outer container.  Dewar flasks for extremely cold liquids such as liquid helium have another double-walled container filled with liquid nitrogen.  Dewar flasks are named after their inventor, James Dewar, the man who first liquefied hydrogen.  Thermos bottles are smaller vacuum flasks fitted in a protective casing.

Cryogenic barcode labels are used to mark Dewar flasks containing these liquids, and will not frost over down to −195 degrees Celsius.

Cryogenic transfer pumps are the pumps used on LNG piers to transfer liquefied natural gas from LNG carriers to LNG storage tanks, as are cryogenic valves.

Cryogenic processing 
The field of cryogenics advanced during World War II when scientists found that metals frozen to low temperatures showed more resistance to wear.  Based on this theory of cryogenic hardening, the commercial cryogenic processing industry was founded in 1966 by Bill and Ed Busch. With a background in the heat treating industry, the Busch brothers founded a company in Detroit called CryoTech in 1966  which merged with 300 Below in 1999 to become the world's largest and oldest commercial cryogenic processing company. Busch originally experimented with the possibility of increasing the life of metal tools to anywhere between 200% and 400% of the original life expectancy using cryogenic tempering instead of heat treating. This evolved in the late 1990s into the treatment of other parts.

Cryogens, such as liquid nitrogen, are further used for specialty chilling and freezing applications. Special cryogenic chemical reactors are used to remove reaction heat and provide a low temperature environment. The freezing of foods and biotechnology products, like vaccines, requires nitrogen in blast freezing or immersion freezing systems. Certain soft or elastic materials become hard and brittle at very low temperatures, which makes cryogenic milling (cryomilling) an option for some materials that cannot easily be milled at higher temperatures.

Cryogenic processing is not a substitute for heat treatment, but rather an extension of the heating–quenching–tempering cycle. Normally, when an item is quenched, the final temperature is ambient. The only reason for this is that most heat treaters do not have cooling equipment. There is nothing metallurgically significant about ambient temperature.
In most instances the cryogenic cycle is followed by a heat tempering procedure. As all alloys do not have the same chemical constituents, the tempering procedure varies according to the material's chemical composition, thermal history and/or a tool's particular service application.

The entire process takes 3–4 days.

Fuels 
Another use of cryogenics is cryogenic fuels for rockets with liquid hydrogen as the most widely used example. Liquid oxygen (LOX) is even more widely used but as an oxidizer, not a fuel. NASA's workhorse Space Shuttle used cryogenic hydrogen/oxygen propellant as its primary means of getting into orbit. LOX is also widely used with RP-1 kerosene, a non-cryogenic hydrocarbon, such as in the rockets built for the Soviet space program by Sergei Korolev.

Russian aircraft manufacturer Tupolev developed a version of its popular design Tu-154 with a cryogenic fuel system, known as the Tu-155. The plane uses a fuel referred to as  liquefied natural gas or LNG, and made its first flight in 1989.

Other applications 

Some applications of cryogenics:

 Nuclear magnetic resonance (NMR) is one of the most common methods to determine the physical and chemical properties of atoms by detecting the radio frequency absorbed and subsequent relaxation of nuclei in a magnetic field.  This is one of the most commonly used characterization techniques and has applications in numerous fields.  Primarily, the strong magnetic fields are generated by supercooling electromagnets, although there are spectrometers that do not require cryogens.  In traditional superconducting solenoids, liquid helium is used to cool the inner coils because it has a boiling point of around 4 K at ambient pressure.  Cheap metallic superconductors can be used for the coil wiring.  So-called high-temperature superconducting compounds can be made to super conduct with the use of liquid nitrogen, which boils at around 77 K.
 Magnetic resonance imaging (MRI) is a complex application of NMR where the geometry of the resonances is deconvoluted and used to image objects by detecting the relaxation of protons that have been perturbed by a radio-frequency pulse in the strong magnetic field. This is most commonly used in health applications.
 In large cities, it is difficult to transmit power by overhead cables, so underground cables are used. But underground cables get heated and the resistance of the wire increases, leading to waste of power.  Superconductors could be used to increase power throughput, although they would require cryogenic liquids such as nitrogen or helium to cool special alloy-containing cables to increase power transmission.  Several feasibility studies have been performed and the field is the subject of an agreement within the International Energy Agency.

 Cryogenic gases are used in transportation and storage of large masses of frozen food. When very large quantities of food must be transported to regions like war zones, earthquake hit regions, etc., they must be stored for a long time, so cryogenic food freezing is used. Cryogenic food freezing is also helpful for large scale food processing industries.
Many infrared (forward looking infrared) cameras require their detectors to be cryogenically cooled.
 Certain rare blood groups are stored at low temperatures, such as −165 °C, at blood banks.
 Cryogenics technology using liquid nitrogen and CO2 has been built into nightclub effect systems to create a chilling effect and white fog that can be illuminated with colored lights.
 Cryogenic cooling is used to cool the tool tip at the time of machining in manufacturing process. It increases the tool life. Oxygen is used to perform several important functions in the steel manufacturing process.
 Many rockets use cryogenic gases as propellants. These include liquid oxygen, liquid hydrogen, and liquid methane.
 By freezing the automobile or truck tire in liquid nitrogen, the rubber is made brittle and can be crushed into small particles. These particles can be used again for other items.
 Experimental research on certain physics phenomena, such as spintronics and magnetotransport properties, requires cryogenic temperatures for the effects to be observed.
 Certain vaccines must be stored at cryogenic temperatures. (See cold chain.)

Production 
Cryogenic cooling of devices and material is usually achieved via the use of liquid nitrogen, liquid helium, or a mechanical cryocooler (which uses high-pressure helium lines). Gifford-McMahon cryocoolers, pulse tube cryocoolers and Stirling cryocoolers are in wide use with selection based on required base temperature and cooling capacity. The most recent development in cryogenics is the use of magnets as regenerators as well as refrigerators. These devices work on the principle known as the magnetocaloric effect.

Detectors 

There are various cryogenic detectors which are used to detect particles.

For cryogenic temperature measurement down to 30 K, Pt100 sensors, a resistance temperature detector (RTD), are used. For temperatures lower than 30 K, it is necessary to use a silicon diode for accuracy.

See also 
 Absolute zero
 Coldest temperature recorded on Earth
 Cryogenic grinding

References

Further reading 
 Haselden, G. G. (1971), Cryogenic fundamentals, Academic Press, New York, .

 
Cooling technology
Industrial gases